The Men's aerials event in freestyle skiing at the 2006 Winter Olympics in Turin, Italy began on 20 February and concluded on 23 February at Sauze d'Oulx.

Results

Qualification
The qualification round took place on the afternoon of 15 February, with 31 skiers competing, though three did not start. The top 12 advanced to the final.

Final
The final took place on the evening of 23 February, with Han Xiaopeng's second jump, a back-layout double-full full, putting him past Belarus's Dmitri Dashinski, into the gold medal spot.

References

Men's freestyle skiing at the 2006 Winter Olympics
Men's events at the 2006 Winter Olympics